The year 1993 was the 212th year of the Rattanakosin Kingdom of Thailand. It was the 48th year of the reign of King Bhumibol Adulyadej (Rama IX) and is reckoned as the year 2536 in the Buddhist Era.

Incumbents
King: Bhumibol Adulyadej 
Crown Prince: Vajiralongkorn
Prime Minister: Chuan Leekpai
Supreme Patriarch: Nyanasamvara Suvaddhana

Events

January

February

March

April

May
May 11 – Jirapong Meenapra, Thai sprinter

June

July

August

September

October

November

December

Births
21 July – Luksika Kumkhum, tennis player

Deaths

See also
 1993 in Thai television
 List of Thai films of 1993

References

External links

 
Years of the 20th century in Thailand
Thailand
Thailand
1990s in Thailand